A political theorist is someone who engages in constructing or evaluating political theory, including political philosophy. Theorists may be  academics or independent scholars. Here the most notable political theorists are categorized by their -ism or school of thought, with a remaining category ("Other") for those theorists who do not fit into any of the major traditions.

Anarchist 
 Mikhail Bakunin
 Murray Bookchin
 Noam Chomsky
 William Godwin
 Emma Goldman
 Peter Kropotkin
 Pierre-Joseph Proudhon
 James C. Scott
 John Zerzan
 Howard Zinn

Classical liberal 
 Raymond Aron
 Frédéric Bastiat
 Isaiah Berlin
 Benjamin Franklin
 Francis Fukuyama
 Hugo Grotius
 Friedrich Hayek
 Immanuel Kant
 John Locke
 James Madison
 John Milton
 Montesquieu
 Karl Popper
 Samuel von Pufendorf
 Joseph Schumpeter
 Adam Smith
 Alexis de Tocqueville

Conservative 
 Edmund Burke
 James Burnham
 Samuel Taylor Coleridge
 Juan Donoso Cortés
 Julius Evola
 Georg Wilhelm Friedrich Hegel
 Johann Gottfried von Herder
 Russell Kirk
 Erik von Kuehnelt-Leddihn
 Gustave Le Bon
 Joseph de Maistre
 Harvey Mansfield
 Charles Maurras
 Adam Müller
 Michael Oakeshott
 Wilhelm Röpke
 Carl Schmitt
 Roger Scruton
 Oswald Spengler
 Leo Strauss
 Eric Voegelin

Feminist 
 Wendy Brown
 Raya Dunayevskaya
 Nancy Fraser
 Betty Friedan
 Chantal Mouffe
 Martha Nussbaum
 Mary Wollstonecraft

Libertarian 
 David D. Friedman
 Hans-Hermann Hoppe
 Rose Wilder Lane
 Robert Nozick
 Ayn Rand
 Murray Rothbard
 Lysander Spooner
 Max Stirner

Marxist 
 Theodor Adorno
 Tariq Ali
 Louis Althusser
 Cornelius Castoriadis
 Friedrich Engels
 Frantz Fanon
 Antonio Gramsci
 Che Guevara
 Ho Chi Minh
 C.L.R. James
 Kim Il-sung
 Ernesto Laclau
 Vladimir Lenin
 György Lukács
 Rosa Luxemburg
 Herbert Marcuse
 Karl Marx
 Antonio Negri
 Leon Trotsky

Religious 
 Muhammad Asad
 Muammar Gaddafi
 René Guénon
 Muhammad Iqbal
 Alasdair MacIntyre
 Prabhat Ranjan Sarkar
 Vinayak Damodar Savarkar
 Charles Taylor
 Simone Weil

Social liberal 
 Kenneth Arrow
 Jeremy Bentham
 Robert Dahl
 Amy Gutmann
 Will Kymlicka
 John Stuart Mill
 John Rawls
 Michael Walzer

Other 
 Eqbal Ahmad
 Gabriel Almond
 Hannah Arendt
 Aristotle
 Chanakya
 Cicero
 Confucius
 Dobrica Ćosić
 Ronald Dworkin
 David Easton
 Erich Fromm
 Jürgen Habermas
 Theodor Herzl
 Thomas Hobbes
 Leszek Kołakowski
 Ali Latifiyan
 Niccolò Machiavelli
 Mencius
 Thomas More
 Thomas Paine
 Plato
 Robert D. Putnam
 Jean-Jacques Rousseau

See also 

 Political science
 Political scientist
 Politics

Political theorists
Political theorist